George Henry Sauer Sr. (December 11, 1910 – February 5, 1994) was an American football player, coach, college sports administrator, and professional football executive.

Career
Sauer attended the University of Nebraska where he was an All-American halfback under Dana X. Bible from 1931-1933. After college, he played for the Green Bay Packers of the National Football League (NFL) from 1935 to 1937, helping them win the 1936 NFL championship as their starting left halfback. Sauer left professional football in 1937 and coached at the University of New Hampshire from 1937 to 1941, compiling a record of 22-18-1. He left his coaching position and enlisted in the U.S. Navy in 1942 and was commissioned as an officer after completing the requisite training. After he completed his military service, he coached for two years at University of Kansas, he compiled a 15–3–2 (.786) record, winning the conference title in each season. After he left Kansas, Sauer coached at the United States Naval Academy (1948–1949), and Baylor University (1950–1955), compiling a career college football record of 78–55–9 and earning trips to both the Orange Bowl and the Gator Bowl. Sauer remained at Baylor as Athletic Director until 1960 when he became the first General Manager of the New York Titans of the American Football League. The Titans later reorganized and in 1963 were renamed in as the New York Jets. As director of player personnel, Sauer drafted and signed his own son, George Sauer Jr. as a wide receiver. Sauer remained with the Jets until 1969 when he was named general manager of the Boston Patriots.

Sauer appeared as an imposter on the February 26, 1962 episode of the game show To Tell The Truth.

Death and legacy
Sauer died in 1994 after a 10 year battle with Alzheimer's disease. At the time of his death, he was survived by his wife Lillian, son George Sauer Jr., and daughter, Dana.

Sauer was inducted into the College Football Hall of Fame as a player in 1954 and in 1998 was inducted into the University of New Hampshire Wildcats' Hall of Fame.

Head coaching record

Football

References

External links
 
 

1910 births
1994 deaths
All-American college football players
American football halfbacks
Baylor Bears athletic directors
Baylor Bears football coaches
Green Bay Packers players
Kansas Jayhawks football coaches
National Football League general managers
Navy Midshipmen football coaches
Nebraska Cornhuskers football players
New England Patriots executives
New Hampshire Wildcats football coaches
New Hampshire Wildcats men's basketball coaches
New York Jets executives
Pensacola Naval Air Station Goslings football players
College men's basketball head coaches in the United States
College Football Hall of Fame inductees
United States Navy officers
United States Navy personnel of World War II
People from Hitchcock County, Nebraska
Coaches of American football from Nebraska
Players of American football from Nebraska
Basketball coaches from Nebraska
Military personnel from Nebraska
American people of German descent